Juliana Pegues is an American writer, performer and community activist living in Minnesota.

Born in Taiwan and raised in Alaska, Pegues has been a member of both the women of color theater group Mama Mosaic and Mango Tribe, a national Asian Pacific Islander American women's performance collective.

Her one-woman shows: Made In Taiwan, First the Forest, and Fifteen were presented respectively by the Walker Art Center, the Jerome Foundation Performance Art Commission, and Intermedia Arts. Her work has also been presented at the Pillsbury House Theater, and The Southern Theater. David Mura directed her play "Q and A" at Mixed Blood Theatre.
Her poetry has been published in several anthologies and in the Asian American Renaissance Journal, Mizna, and Lodestar Quarterly. Her writings also include White Rice: A Search for Identity and pieces for the Fab Feminist Zine.

Her poetry has been featured at numerous open mics and cabarets across the country.

She has worked for such groups as Asian Immigrant Women Advocates, Women Against Military Madness, Asian American Renaissance, APLB (Asian Pacific Lesbians and Bisexuals)- Twin Cities, and the Women's Prison Book Project.

She is the author of the chapbook Immigrant Dictionary.

Pegues is the recipient of many awards and honors including a Playwright's Center Many Voices fellow, and hosted AARGH, the Asian American Cabaret with Sandy Agustin.

In 1993, she and performance artist Ken Choy were arrested for protesting a performance of Madame Butterfly at the Minnesota Opera. Both were charged with disorderly conduct and paid a $25 fine.

References 

American activists
American women poets
American LGBT poets
Living people
Year of birth missing (living people)
Taiwanese emigrants to the United States
Poets from Alaska
LGBT people from Alaska
LGBT people from Minnesota
21st-century American women